Gingelom is a municipality located in the Belgian province of Limburg. On 1 January 2006 Gingelom had a total population of 7,847. The total area is 56.49 km2 (21.81 sq mi) which gives a population density of 139 inhabitants per km2 (359/sq mi).

The municipality includes the old municipalities of Borlo, Buvingen, Jeuk, Montenaken, Niel-bij-Sint-Truiden, Mielen boven Aalst, Muizen, Boekhout, Vorsen and Kortijs.

Notable people
 Erasme Louis Surlet de Chokier

References

External links 
 
Official website

Municipalities of Limburg (Belgium)